Montreux 82 is a live album by saxophonist Charles Lloyd recorded at the Montreux Jazz Festival in 1982 and released on the Elektra/Musician label the following year.

Reception 

Allmusic's Scott Yanow said: "Charles Lloyd came out of isolation and retirement in 1982 due to the persuasion of the then-unknown pianist Michel Petrucciani. As can be heard on this concert LP from the 1982 Montreux Jazz Festival, Lloyd's styles and sounds on tenor and flute were unchanged from his glory days in the 1960s ... excellent music".

Track listing 
All compositions by Charles Lloyd except where noted
 Introduction – 1:20
 "The Call (Imke)" – 10:13
 "Wind in the Trees" – 11:36
 "Very Early" (Bill Evans) – 10:37
 "Michel" – 1:13
 "Forest Flower: 1. Sunrise 2. Sunset" – 11:45

Personnel 
Charles Lloyd – tenor saxophone, flute
Michel Petrucciani – piano
Palle Danielsson – bass
Son Ship Theus – drums

References 

Charles Lloyd (jazz musician) live albums
1983 live albums
Elektra/Musician live albums
Albums recorded at the Montreux Jazz Festival